Desmarestia aculeata is a species of brown algae found worldwide. Its common names include color changer, Desmarest's flattened weed, and sea sorrel, though the last name can refer to other species of Desmarestia.

Photos

References

Desmarestiales